Le Soleil (The Sun) is a French-language daily newspaper in Quebec City, Quebec. It was founded on December 28, 1896 and is published in compact format since April 2006 (it had traditionally been printed in broadsheet). It is distributed mainly in Quebec City; however, it is also for sale at newsstands in Ottawa, Montreal, New Brunswick and some places in Florida, where many Quebecers spend the winter. It is owned by Groupe Capitales Médias.

On weekdays Le Soleil contains four sections : the front section (Actualités), containing local and international news coverage; the Arts & Life, or "B" section (Arts & Vie); the Business, or "C" section (Économie); and the Sports, or "S" section.

History 

Le Soleil rose from the ashes of L'Électeur, the official newspaper of the Liberal Party of Canada, which shut down in December 1896. The first edition was published on December 28, 1896. one day after the disappearance of its predecessor, which shut down because the Catholic clergy had forbidden it to parishioners when the newspaper criticized the Church's electoral interference. It was renamed Le Soleil in reference to Le Soleil, a daily newspaper based in Paris by the same name.

In 1957, Le Soleil (then owned by Oscar Gilbert) cut ties to the Liberal Party of Canada to concentrate on news coverage. Daily circulation rose past 100,000 in the 1960s, and over 150,000 in the 1970s.

Beginning in 1973, many large corporations began to express interest in acquiring Le Soleil. Controversy was stirred when Paul Desmarais's Power Corporation of Canada announced its intention to buy the daily. It provoked the intervention of Quebec Premier Robert Bourassa because such a transaction would have concentrated 70% of Quebec francophone daily newspapers in the hands of a single company. Eventually, the paper was bought by Unimédia.

In 1987, Conrad Black's Hollinger Inc. acquired the newspaper, which would eventually pass into the hands of Groupe Gesca, which also owns several Quebec newspapers. It is a wholly-owned subsidiary of Power Corporation of Canada.

In 2006, the newspaper had switched to a tabloid format at the same time as Sherbrooke's La Tribune and Trois-Rivières's Le Nouvelliste, all of wjhich are owned by Gesca. Recent declines in readership dueto competition by Le Journal de Québec was the main explanation of the switch from a broadsheet format.

Circulation 
Le Soleil  has seen like most Canadian daily newspapers a decline in circulation. Its total circulation dropped by  percent to 78,455 copies daily from 2009 to 2015.

Daily average

Featured contributors 
François Bourque (city columnist)
 Gilbert Lavoie (political analyst)
 Brigitte Breton (editorialist)
 Pierre Asselin (editorialist)
 Mylène Moisan (columnist)

See also
List of newspapers in Canada

References

Newspapers published in Quebec City
Gesca Limitée publications
French-language newspapers published in Quebec
Daily newspapers published in Quebec
Publications established in 1896
1896 establishments in Quebec